Diocletian windows, also called thermal windows, are large semicircular windows characteristic of the enormous public baths (thermae) of Ancient Rome. They have been revived on a limited basis by some classical revivalist architects in more modern times.

Description
Diocletian windows are large segmental arched windows (or other openings), which are usually divided into three lights (window compartments) by two vertical mullions. The central compartment is often wider than the two side lights on either side of it.

Names 
Diocletian windows are named after the windows found in the Baths of Diocletian (AD 302) in Rome. (The Thermae is now the church of Santa Maria degli Angeli e dei Martiri.) The variant name, thermal window, also comes from their association with the Thermae of Diocletian.

Influence 
This type of window was revived and used in Italy in the 16th century, especially by Andrea Palladio. Palladio and others incorporated an elongated Diocletian window in the form of an arched central light flanked by narrower, square-headed apertures. This combination became known as a Venetian window.

The Diocletian window was much used in the early 18th century by the English architect Richard Boyle,  one of the originators of the English Palladian style, and by his followers.

Diocletian windows continued to be used occasionally in large public buildings in the various devolutions of Neoclassical architecture including the Beaux Arts movement (1880–1920).

Gallery

See also 
 Trifora

References 

Ancient Roman buildings and structures in Rome
Late Roman Empire art
Ancient Roman architectural elements
Architectural design
Architectural history
Windows
Diocletian